Encelia resinifera, the sticky brittlebush, is a North American species of flowering plant in the family Asteraceae.

Distribution
It grows in soils derived from sandstone.

Description
The trunk, which becomes fissured with age, supports slender stems.

The leaves, which range between 10 and 25 mm in length, are ovate or lanceolate and are usually pointed at the tips.

The yellow flowerheads are borne singly, appearing between May and July (late fall to mid-summer) in their native range. These have 8-13 ray florets.

Subspecies
Two subspecies have been identified:
Encelia resinifera subsp. resinifera — button brittlebush. 
Encelia resinifera subsp. tenuifolia C.Clark — found in the Grand Canyon area. It has both leaves and ray laminae with a length that is more than three times their width.

Taxonomy
Encelia resinifera was originally described as a variety of Encelia frutescens (Encelia frutescens var. resinosa) by M.E.Jones in 1913. In 1998 it was reclassified as a distinct species by Curtis Clark.

References

resinifera
Flora of the Colorado Plateau and Canyonlands region
Flora of Arizona
Flora of Utah
Endemic flora of the United States
Plants described in 1913
Flora without expected TNC conservation status